State Line or Stateline may refer to:

 Border, a geographic boundary

Media
 Stateline (TV program) from the Australian Broadcasting Corporation
 Stateline, a blog operated by The Pew Charitable Trusts

Places
 Stateline, California, near Lake Tahoe
 Stateline, Idaho, A city in Kootenai County
 State Line, St. Joseph County, Indiana
 State Line, Vigo County, Indiana
 Guthrie, Kentucky, formerly known as State Line
 State Line, Kentucky
 State Line, Mississippi
 Stateline, Nevada
 Primm, Nevada, formerly known as State Line
 State Line, Pennsylvania (disambiguation), several places
 State Line, South Carolina
 State Line City, Indiana
 State Line, Fitzwilliam, New Hampshire

Roads
 State Line Avenue, between Texas and Arkansas in the Texarkana metropolitan area
 State Line Road, between Kansas and Missouri in the Kansas City metropolitan area

See also
 Stateline Wind Project